The Ntlo ya Dikgosi (Tswana for "House of Chiefs") in Botswana is an advisory body to the country's parliament.

Composition 

The house consists of 35 members. Eight members are hereditary chiefs (kgosi) from Botswana's principal tribes (BaKgatla, BaKwêna, BaMalete, BamaNgwato, BaNgwaketse, BaRôlông, BaTawana, and BaTlôkwa). 20 members are indirectly elected and serve five-year terms. Two are chosen from the districts of North-East and Chobe. The remaining 5 members are appointed by the country's president. They must be at least 21 years of age, proficient in the English language, and have not participated in active politics in the past five years. Chiefs may not belong to political parties.

Powers 

The house acts as a purely advisory body to the Parliament and has no legislative nor veto power. All bills affecting tribal organization and property, customary law, and the administration of customary courts go through the house before being discussed in the National Assembly. Members must also be consulted when the constitution is being reviewed or amended. The body has the power to summon members of government to appear before it.

See also 
National Assembly of Botswana
History of Botswana
Kgosi
 List of Chairpersons of the Ntlo ya Dikgosi
 Senate of Lesotho
 National House of Traditional Leaders of South Africa
 Council of Traditional Leaders of Namibia

References 

1961 establishments in Bechuanaland Protectorate
Government of Botswana